Mannanthala Anandavalleshwaram Devi Temple is a Hindu temple in the Mannanthala suburb of Thiruvananthapuram, India.

Mannanthala Anandavalleshwaram temple situated near Main road, one Bus stop ahead of Mannanthala junction while travelling from Trivandrum to Kottayam via MC road. This temple can easily identified by its North Indian style architecture and presence of a Banyan tree near the temple.

Origin
In earlier days priests worshiped 'Bhadrakali'. They sacrificed animals to please the Devi. At that time this was a common thing. One day Sree Narayana Guru came there. He raised his voice against this brutal and ancient act and stopped the animal sacrifice at the temple. Here Guru made a new Prathista after the famous Aruvippuram Prathista. Later Guru advised the Chief priest of the temple to worship Devi as 'Sree Parvathy'. Guru also wrote a poem, which hails the Devi, Known as "Mannanthala Devi Stavam".From that day onwards Devi has been worshiped as 'Sree Parvathy'.

Present state
Now main deity is Devi Sree Parvathy. Lord Vinayaka, Lord Subramanya and Nagaraja are Sub deities. Temple opens at Five o clock and closes around Ten o clock, in the morning, in normal days. Similarly temple opens at Five o clock and closes around Eight o clock in the evening. Remember this timing is not valid for festival days. Different types of poojas are available at this temple. Priests are selected from Ezhava Community.

Administration
The administration of this temple is carried out by a selected trust under SNDP Yogam.

See also
 Narayana Guru
 Sree Narayana Dharma Paripalana
 Ezhava
 Aruvippuram
 Sivagiri, Kerala
 Mannanthala

References
 Sree Narayana Guru
 Mannanthala Devi

Hindu temples in Thiruvananthapuram district